"Love or Something Like It" is a song co-written and performed by American country music artist Kenny Rogers.  It was released in May 1978 as the first single and title track from the album Love or Something Like It.  The song was written by Rogers and Steven Glassmeyer (a member of Rogers's backing band) and was Kenny Rogers's third number one on the country chart.  The single stayed at number one for one week (the only number one of his career that he had a hand in writing) and spent a total of ten weeks on the country chart.

Chart performance

Cover versions
In 2005, country singer Deryl Dodd recorded a cover on his album Stronger Proof.

References

1978 singles
1978 songs
Kenny Rogers songs
Deryl Dodd songs
Songs written by Kenny Rogers
Song recordings produced by Larry Butler (producer)
United Artists Records singles